The 1963–64 Czechoslovak Extraliga season was the 21st season of the Czechoslovak Extraliga, the top level of ice hockey in Czechoslovakia. 12 teams participated in the league, and ZKL Brno won the championship.

First round

Final round

7th–12th place

1. Liga-Qualification

External links
History of Czechoslovak ice hockey

Czech
Czechoslovak Extraliga seasons
1963 in Czechoslovak sport
1964 in Czechoslovak sport